Darskowo  is a village in the administrative district of Gmina Złocieniec, within Drawsko County, West Pomeranian Voivodeship, in north-western Poland.

The village has a population of 340.

During World War II the Germans established and operated a forced labour camp for prisoners of war of various nationalities in the village.

There is a nursing home and a historic church of Saints Peter and Paul in Darskowo.

Notable residents
Joachim Müncheberg (1918-1943), Luftwaffe pilot

References

Darskowo